Rhododendron hippophaeoides (灰背杜鹃) is a species of flowering plant in the family Ericaceae. It is in the subgenus Rhododendron (scaly or lepidote rhododendrons), subsection Lapponica. The flowers are bright rose or lavender-blue to bluish purple, or (rarely) white.

References

Sources
 I. B. Balfour & W. W. Smith, Notes Roy. Bot. Gard. Edinburgh 9(44-45): 236-237 236 1916.
 Cullen, J. 1980. "A revision of Rhododendron. I. Subgenus Rhododendron sections Rhododendron & Pogonanthum", Notes Roy. Bot. Gard. Edinburgh, 39:96–97.

hippophaeoides
Taxa named by Isaac Bayley Balfour
Taxa named by William Wright Smith